Neoschumannia is a genus of plant in family Apocynaceae, first described as a genus in 1905. It is native to Africa.

Species
 Neoschumannia cardinea (S. Moore) Meve - Zimbabwe
 Neoschumannia kamerunensis Schltr. -  Cameroon

References

Asclepiadoideae
Apocynaceae genera
Flora of Africa
Taxonomy articles created by Polbot